Actin related protein 2/3 complex inhibitor is a protein that in humans is encoded by the ARPIN gene.

References

Further reading

External links 
 PDBe-KB provides an overview of all the structure information available in the PDB for Human Actin related protein 2/3 complex inhibitor (ARPIN)